Travis Jewett is an American baseball coach and former player, who is the current hitting coach and recruiting coordinator for the USC Trojans. Jewett played college baseball for Lower Columbia College team while obtaining his associate degree. He completed his education at Washington State University, where he did not play baseball. He then served as the head coach of the Tulane Green Wave (2017–2022).

Playing career
Jewett played college baseball at Lower Columbia College during the 1990 and 1991 seasons.

Coaching career
In 1994, Jewett joined the Tacoma Community College coaching staff. The following season he was named the head coach of Tacoma. In 1997, Jewett left to take the head coaching job at Edmonds Community College. He led the Tritons to the 1998 Northwest Athletic Conference title.

Jewett then went on to assist at Gonzaga, Washington, Washington State, Arizona State and Vanderbilt.

On July 14, 2016, Jewett was named head coach at Tulane.  On May 16, 2022, Jewett agreed to part ways with Tulane, and Jay Ulhman was named the interim head coach for the remainder of the 2022 season. Jewett complied a 160–136–1 record over his 6 years as head coach of the Green Wave.

On July 7, 2022, Jewett was named the hitting coach and recruiting coordinator for the USC Trojans.

Head coaching record

See also
 List of current NCAA Division I baseball coaches

References

External links
Tulane Green Wave bio

Living people
Lower Columbia Red Devils baseball players
Washington State University alumni
Tacoma Titans baseball coaches
Edmonds Tritons baseball coaches
Gonzaga Bulldogs baseball coaches
Washington Huskies baseball coaches
Washington State Cougars baseball coaches
Arizona State Sun Devils baseball coaches
Tulane Green Wave baseball coaches
USC Trojans baseball coaches
Year of birth missing (living people)